Frank J. LeClair (January 1, 1888 – May 3, 1974) was an commercial fisherman and politician.

LeClair was born in Two Rivers, Wisconsin. He went to the public schools and business college. LeClair served in the United States Navy during World War I. He was a commercial fisherman and fish broker. LeClair served on the board of director of the Manitowoc County Farm Bureau Federation. LeClair served on the Two Rivers Town Board. He also served on the school board. He was a Republican. LeClair served in the Wisconsin Assembly from 1947 to 1949 and from 1951 to 1957. LeClair died at the Two Rivers Municipal Hospital in Two Rivers, Wisconsin.

Notes

External links

1888 births
1974 deaths
People from Two Rivers, Wisconsin
Military personnel from Wisconsin
American fishers
Wisconsin city council members
School board members in Wisconsin
20th-century American politicians
Republican Party members of the Wisconsin State Assembly